see also Étienne Hubert (disambiguation)
Étienne-Hubert de Cambacérès (Montpellier, 1756-Rouen, 1818) was archbishop of Rouen in 1802, cardinal in 1803 and senator from 1805. He was the younger brother of the jurist, Jean Jacques Régis de Cambacérès the Duke of Parma.

References

Archbishops of Rouen
1756 births
1818 deaths
19th-century French cardinals
Cardinals created by Pope Pius VII